The following outline is provided as an overview of and topical guide to the Isle of Man:

The Isle of Man is a self-governing British Crown dependency located in the Irish Sea near the geographic centre of the British Isles. The head of state is Queen Elizabeth II, who holds the title of Lord of Mann. The Crown is represented by a lieutenant governor. The island is not part of the United Kingdom, but external relations, defence, and ultimate good governance of the Isle of Man are the responsibility of the government of the United Kingdom.

General reference 

 Pronunciation:
 Common English country name:  The Isle of Man
 Official English country name:  The Isle of Man
 Common endonym(s): Isle of Man, Mannin
 Official endonym(s):  
 Adjectival(s): Manx 
 Demonym(s): Manxman (Manxmen)
 Etymology: Name of the Isle of Man
 ISO country codes:  IM, IMN, 833
 ISO region codes:  See ISO 3166-2:IM
 Internet country code top-level domain:  .im

Geography of the Isle of Man 

Geography of the Isle of Man
 The Isle of Man is an island and a self-governing Crown dependency
 Coastline: Irish Sea 160 km
 Population of the Isle of Man: 80,058 (estimate) - 194th most populous country
 Area of the Isle of Man:   - 191st largest country
 Atlas of the Isle of Man
 List of places in the Isle of Man

Location of the Isle of Man 
 The Isle of Man is situated within the following regions:
 Northern Hemisphere and Western Hemisphere
 Atlantic Ocean
 North Atlantic
 Irish Sea
 Eurasia
 Europe
 Northern Europe
 British Isles
 Western Europe
 Time zone:  Western European Time or Greenwich Mean Time (UTC+00), Western European Summer Time or British Summer Time (UTC+01)
 Extreme points of the Isle of Man:
 High:  Snaefell 
 Low:  Irish Sea 0 m
 Land boundaries:  None

Environment of Isle of Man 

 Climate of the Isle of Man
 Wildlife of the Isle of Man
 Flora of the Isle of Man
 Fauna of the Isle of Man
 Birds of the Isle of Man
 Extinct animals from the Isle of Man

Natural geographic features of the Isle of Man 

 Hills and mountains of the Isle of Man
 Mountains - The only mountain of the Isle of Man is:
 Snaefell 
 Islands of the Isle of Man
 Rivers of the Isle of Man
 World Heritage Sites in the Isle of Man: None

Administrative divisions of the Isle of Man 

Administrative divisions of the Isle of Man
 Sheadings of the Isle of Man
 Parishes of the Isle of Man
 Municipalities of the Isle of Man

Sheadings of the Isle of Man 

The Isle of Man has historically been divided into six sheadings:
 Ayre
 Garff
 Glenfaba
 Michael
 Middle
 Rushen

Parishes of the Isle of Man 

The historic parishes within each sheading of the Isle of Man are:

 Ayre - Andreas, Bride, Lezayre
 Garff - Lonan, Maughold, Onchan (Kione Droghad)
 Glenfaba - German, Patrick
 Michael - Ballaugh (Balley ny Loughey), Jurby (Jourbee), Michael (Maayl)
 Middle - Braddan, Marown, Santon
 Rushen - Arbory, Rushen (Rosien), Malew

Municipalities of the Isle of Man 

List of places in the Isle of Man

Towns of the Isle of Man 

The official towns of the Isle of Man are:

 Capital of the Isle of Man: Douglas 
 Castletown 
 Peel 
 Ramsey

Villages of the Isle of Man 

Villages of the Isle of Man include:

 Andreas 
 Baldrine 
 Ballabeg 
 Ballasalla 
 Ballaugh 
 Crosby 
 Foxdale 
 Glen Maye 
 Laxey 
 Jurby 
 Port St Mary 
 Port Erin 
 St John's 
 Union Mills

Demography of the Isle of Man 

Demographics of the Isle of Man

Neighbouring countries
Being an island, the Isle of Man shares no land borders with other countries. However, its two neighbours are:

 Republic of Ireland
 United Kingdom of Great Britain and Northern Ireland

Government and politics of the Isle of Man 

Politics of the Isle of Man
 Form of government: Crown Dependency, and a parliamentary multi-party representative democracy
 State officials of the Isle of Man
 Capital of the Isle of Man: Douglas
 Elections in the Isle of Man
 Political parties in the Isle of Man
 Order of precedence in the Isle of Man
 Taxation in the Isle of Man
 Section 50C of the Isle of Man Income Tax Act 1970

Branches of the government of the Isle of Man 

Government of the Isle of Man

Executive branch of the government of the Isle of Man 
 Head of state: Lord of Mann, Charles III of the United Kingdom
 Lord of Mann's representative: Lieutenant Governor of the Isle of Man
 Head of government: Chief Minister of the Isle of Man
Council of Ministers
 Departments of the Isle of Man government
Treasury
Financial Supervision Commission
Insurance and Pensions Authority
General Registry
Department of Home Affairs
Communications Commission
Department of Health and Social Security
Department of Education
Department of Trade and Industry
Office of Fair Trading
Post Office
Water Authority
Electricity Authority
Department of Tourism and Leisure
Department of Transport
Department of Agriculture, Fisheries and Forestry
Department of Local Government and the Environment
 Offices of the Isle of Man government
 The Personnel Office
 Civil Service Commission
 Whitley Council (for manual workers)
 Chief Secretary's Office
 Chief Secretary: Mary Williams
 Attorney General's Chambers
 Attorney General: John Quinn
 General Registry of the Isle of Man
 Office of the Data Protection Supervisor
 Isle of Man Civil Service
 Chief Secretary of the Isle of Man

Legislative branch of the government of the Isle of Man 

 Tynwald (bicameral parliament of the Isle of Man)
President of Tynwald: 
 Upper house: Legislative Council of the Isle of Man
 President of the Legislative Council of the Isle of Man: 
 Lower house: House of Keys
 Speaker of the House of Keys

Judicial branch of the government of the Isle of Man 

Judiciary of the Isle of Man
 Judicial appointment: the Judiciary of the Isle of Man are appointed by The Queen, Lord of Mann, acting on the advice of the Secretary of State for Justice in the United Kingdom.
 Court of final appeal in the Isle of Man: Judicial Committee of the Privy Council in the United Kingdom
 Isle of Man High Court
First Deemster: Andrew Corlett
Second Deemster: John Needham
Deemster: Alastair Montgomerie
Judge of Appeal: Geoffrey Tattersall
High Bailiff: 
Deputy High Bailiff: 
Attorney General of the Isle of Man: John Quinn

External relations of the Isle of Man 

External relations of the Isle of Man

International organization membership 
The Isle of Man is a member of:
British-Irish Council (BIC)
Universal Postal Union (UPU)

Law and order in the Isle of Man 

Law of the Isle of Man
 Capital punishment in the Isle of Man
 Citizenship - Natives of the Isle of Man are British citizens
 Human rights in the Isle of Man
 Law enforcement in the Isle of Man
Isle of Man Prison
 Marriage in the Isle of Man
 Software patents in the Isle of Man

Military of the Isle of Man 

Military of the Isle of Man
 Army: Combined Army Reserve Units including 156 Regt RLC 103 RA Regt, 75 Engr Regt, 4 LANCS(Duke of Lancs) & 4 PARA  
 Navy: None
 Air Force: None
 Special forces: None
 Defence: The United Kingdom is responsible for the Island's defence. See Isle of Man#Governance.

Emergency services in the Isle of Man 

 Isle of Man Constabulary
 Isle of Man Coastguard
 Isle of Man Fire and Rescue Service
 Isle of Man Civil Defence Corps
 Isle of Man Ambulance Service

Local government in the Isle of Man 

Local government in the Isle of Man
 Department of Local Government and the Environment

History of the Isle of Man 

 King of Mann and the Isles (1079–1164)
 Battle of the Isle of Man (1158)
 King of Mann (1164 - 1504)
 Lord of Mann (1504–1765)
 Act of Settlement 1704
 Governor of the Isle of Man (1696–1828)
 Lieutenant Governor of the Isle of Man (1773–present)
 Wimund - 12th century, first Bishop of the Isle of Man, warlord
 Internment camps in the Isle of Man
 Extinct animals from the Isle of Man

Culture of the Isle of Man 

Culture of the Isle of Man
 Manx
 Architecture of the Isle of Man
 List of abbeys and priories on the Isle of Man
 List of castles in the Isle of Man
 Languages of the Isle of Man
 Manx, a Gaelic language.
 English language
 Anglo-Manx, the distinctive indigenous English dialect of the Manx
 British English, the usual form of English used in the Isle of Man, especially for formal purposes.
 Cuisine of the Isle of Man
 Events on the Isle of Man
 Festivals in the Isle of Man
 Humour in the Isle of Man
 Manx National Heritage
 Noble and royal titles of the Isle of Man
 Order of precedence in the Isle of Man
 Media in the Isle of Man
 Newspapers of the Isle of Man
 National symbols of the Isle of Man
 Coat of arms of the Isle of Man
 Flag of the Isle of Man
 National anthem of the Isle of Man
 People of the Isle of Man
 Manx people
 Manx surnames
 List of people on stamps of the Isle of Man
 Residents of the Isle of Man
 Public holidays in the Isle of Man
 Religion in the Isle of Man
 Islam in the Isle of Man
 Roman Catholicism in the Isle of Man
 Scouting on the Isle of Man
 World Heritage Sites in the Isle of Man: None

Art in the Isle of Man 
 Cuisine of the Isle of Man
 Literature of the Isle of Man
 Music of the Isle of Man
 Television in the Isle of Man

Sport in the Isle of Man 

Sport in the Isle of Man
 Isle of Man's national sport: Cammag
 Isle of Man cricket team
 Football in the Isle of Man
 Isle of Man Football League
 Football clubs in the Isle of Man
 Rugby union in the Isle of Man
 Isle of Man TT
 Manx Grand Prix

Economy and infrastructure of the Isle of Man 

Economy of the Isle of Man
 Banks of the Isle of Man
 Communications in the Isle of Man
 Internet in the Isle of Man
 Postage stamps and postal history of the Isle of Man
 IM postcode area
 Television in the Isle of Man
 Companies of the Isle of Man
Currency of the Isle of Man: Pound
 Commemorative coins of the Isle of Man
ISO 4217: n/a (informally IMP)
 Energy in the Isle of Man
 Manx Electricity Authority
 Windmills in the Isle of Man
 Isle of Man Stock Exchange
 Traders' currency tokens of the Isle of Man
 Tourism in the Isle of Man
 Transport in the Isle of Man
 Isle of Man Airport
 Rail transport in the Isle of Man
 Roads in the Isle of Man
 Water supply and sanitation in the Isle of Man
 Isle of Man Incinerator

Education in the Isle of Man 

Education in the Isle of Man
 List of universities in the Isle of Man
 List of schools in the Isle of Man

See also 

Crown dependency
List of international rankings
Outline of Europe
Outline of geography
Outline of the United Kingdom

References

External links
 
 isleofman.com The Isle of Man online.
 Isle of Man Guide An extensive guide to the Isle of Man
 Manx Government A comprehensive site covering many aspects of Manx life from fishing to financial regulation
 CIA World Factbook listing for the Isle of Man
 Manx Scenes.com Extensive photographic library.
 Isle of Man Tour 360 degree pictures of the Isle of Man.
 Manxviews Over 1300 Manx images.
 On The Isle of Man Life on the island.

 
 
Isle of Man